"Softly Whispering I Love You" is a song written by Roger Greenaway and Roger Cook originally recorded by the duo under the name of David and Jonathan. This version peaked at No. 23 in Australia on Go-Sets National Top 40 Singles Chart.

The Congregation version
It was covered in 1971 by The Congregation, where the group's version was a worldwide hit. Their version peaked at No. 4 on the UK Singles Chart, 1 in South Africa and New Zealand, No. 10 in Germany and No. 11 in Australia's Go-Sets Singles Chart. In North America, the group was known as The English Congregation, where the song went to #29 on the Billboard Hot 100 and #21 in Canada.

Paul Young version
English singer Paul Young recorded the song for his Other Voices album, and it was released as the first single from the album on 30 April 1990. It reached No. 21 on the UK Singles Chart and No. 16 in Ireland.

Charts

References

1967 songs
Songs written by Roger Greenaway
Songs written by Roger Cook (songwriter)
1971 singles
1990 singles
Paul Young songs